Marco Cecchinato was the defending champion, but lost in the first round to Roberto Carballés Baena.

Casper Ruud became the first Norwegian to win an ATP Tour title, defeating Pedro Sousa in the final, 6–1, 6–4.

Seeds
The top four seeds received a bye into the second round.

Draw

Finals

Top half

Bottom half

Qualifying

Seeds

Qualifiers

Lucky losers

Qualifying draw

First qualifier

Second qualifier

Third qualifier

Fourth qualifier

References

External links
 Main draw
 Qualifying draw

2020 ATP Tour
2020 Singles